The Endeavour Masters was a professional golf tournament held in 1970 at the Cronulla Golf Club in Sydney, New South Wales, Australia. Total prize money was A$10,000.

Guy Wolstenholme shot a final round 67 (−2) to finish at 263. He won by eight strokes over Ted Ball, Vic Bennetts and Kel Nagle.

Winners

References

Golf tournaments in Australia
Golf in New South Wales